Halla Margrét Árnadóttir or Halla Margrét (born 23 April 1964 in Reykjavík) is an Icelandic singer who represented her country in the Eurovision Song Contest 1987, in Brussels. In that competition, she sang the entry Hægt Og Hljótt (in English: (Slowly and Quietly) with music and lyrics by Valgeir Guðjónsson; the conductor was Hjálmar Ragnarsson. The song ended in 16th place (22 countries) and received 28 points.

Since 1997, Halla Margrét has been an opera and concert singer. A soprano, she stars on two DVDs, as Anna in Puccini's Le Villi, and as Tigrana in Puccini's Edgar.

External links 
 
 Information and images of Halla Margrét Árnadóttir
 Halla Margrét singing in Eurovision Song Contest

1964 births
Living people
Eurovision Song Contest entrants of 1987
Halla Margret Arnadottir
Halla Margret Arnadottir
Halla Margret Arnadottir
21st-century Icelandic women singers